is a railway station in Minato, Tokyo, Japan.

It is entirely owned and operated by the Tokyo Metropolitan Bureau of Transportation, but also serves as the northern terminus of the Keikyu Main Line operated by the private railway operator Keikyu. The station is a major transfer point for passengers on the Toei Asakusa Line because most trains on the Asakusa Line switch to the Keikyu Line past Sengakuji: passengers must usually change trains at Sengakuji to reach Gotanda, Nishi-magome and other stations on the south end of the Asakusa Line. The station is designed with platforms shared between Keikyu and Asakusa Line trains to expedite this connection.

The station is named after Sengaku-ji, a nearby temple famous for housing the graves of the Forty-seven rōnin.

Lines
Sengakuji Station is served by the following lines.
Toei Asakusa Line (through service to Keisei Oshiage Line, Keisei Higashi-Narita Line and Shibayama Railway Line)
Keikyu Main Line (through service to Keikyu Airport Line and Keikyu Kurihama Line)

Station layout

History
The station opened on 21 June 1968.

References

External links

 Toei Sengakuji Station information 
 Keikyu Sengakuji Station information 

Railway stations in Japan opened in 1968
Toei Asakusa Line
Keikyū Main Line
Railway stations in Tokyo
Buildings and structures in Minato, Tokyo